Coldiron is a census-designated place and unincorporated community in Harlan County, Kentucky, United States. Its population was 222 as of the 2020 census.

Demographics

References

Census-designated places in Harlan County, Kentucky
Census-designated places in Kentucky
Unincorporated communities in Kentucky
Unincorporated communities in Harlan County, Kentucky